Howard W. Carson (April 30, 1910 – August 9, 1994) was an American Democratic politician. Carson was a member of the West Virginia Senate for the 11th district from 1956 to 1968. From 1961 to 1968, he served as President of the West Virginia Senate.

Early life
Carson was born in Montgomery, Fayette County on April 30, 1910. He was the son of Lawrence W. and Alice Montgomery Carson. He received a law degree from Washington and Lee University.

Career
Carson was named as Assistant Prosecuting Attorney for Fayette County, West Virginia in 1944. At roughly the same time, Carson became the chairman of the Fayette County Democratic Executive Committee. He resigned this position in 1948 to unsuccessfully run for the state's 11th Senate district, being defeated in the Democratic primary by J. Alfred Taylor, Jr. In 1952, Carson won the race for Prosecuting Attorney for Fayette County, succeeding his former boss C.B. Vickers.

Carson was elected to the West Virginia Senate in 1956. He was nominated again in 1960. As no one filed to stand in the Republican primary, the party executive committee chose John Gwinn to oppose Carson's reelection. However, Gwinn's certification was lost in the mail, and he was disqualified from the ballot. A write-in campaign for Gwinn only earned 5.2% of the vote, and Carson was re-elected.

Incumbent Senate President Ralph J. Bean did not seek reelection in 1960, leaving his position open for a replacement. Candidates included Carson and the moderate Julius W. Singleton Jr. of Morgantown. With the support of incoming Governor W. W. Barron and organized labor groups, Carson earned so much support among Senate Democrats that Singleton was not able to place his name for nomination. He would win his seat again in 1964, with no Republican opposition on the ballot.

Instead of running for a fourth term in the Senate, Carson opted to run for Attorney General. He was defeated in the Democratic primary by Chauncey H. Browning Jr. After losing, Carson practiced law privately in Fayette County. He was named the Clerk of the Senate for the 1972, 1973, and 1974 terms. He declined to seek the nomination for the 1975 session, citing health reasons.

Personal life
Carson was married to Sunny N.  in 1939, and had two children. He attended Fayetteville Methodist Church.

Carson died August 9, 1994, in his home in Charlottesville, Virginia.

References

1910 births
1994 deaths
People from Fayette County, West Virginia
Presidents of the West Virginia State Senate
West Virginia state senators
20th-century American politicians